Nationalist Democratic Action is a right-wing political party in Bolivia led by Óscar Daza Márquez. ADN was founded on March 23, 1979 by the military dictator Hugo Banzer after he stepped down from power. As leader of the ADN, Banzer ran in the 1979, 1980, 1985, 1989, 1993, and 1997 presidential elections. He obtained third place in 1979 and 1980, and won a plurality of the 1985 vote, but, since he did not attain the 50% necessary for direct election, Congress selected the chief executive. Its choice was the second-place finisher, Víctor Paz Estenssoro.

History
Banzer's party at that point opted for supporting the MNR in a coalition government. Indeed, ADN would go on to claim authorship to some of the major neoliberal economic reforms instituted by President Paz to curb galloping hyperinflation, repress labor unions, and reduce the size of the government. Banzer finished second in the 1989 elections, but supported in Congress the third-place finisher, the left-leaning Jaime Paz Zamora, who became President with ADN help. The party again governed as the main support of a ruling coalition, this time under Paz Zamora. Banzer's ADN again finished second in 1993, this time to the MNR's Gonzalo Sánchez de Lozada.

Finally, in 1997, Banzer Suárez became the constitutionally-elected President of Bolivia, at the age of 71. He was the first former dictator in Latin America's recent history to transition successfully to democratic politics and return to power by way of the ballot box. During his tenure, he launched—under the guidelines outlined by the United States—a program to fight drug-trafficking in Bolivia, which called for the eradication of coca, a controversial strategy. He also had some trouble with the unions, but nonetheless did nothing to rule in a conciliatory and non-arbitrary manner. He was diagnosed with lung cancer in June 27, 2001, and even though he had earned a five-year term (he had himself agitated to legally enlarge the presidential term) Banzer resigned on August 7, 2001. He was succeeded by his Vice-President, Jorge Quiroga. Banzer's health declined rapidly thereafter, and he died on May 5, 2002.

Quiroga then became leader and heir apparent of the ADN, but when he ran for President in the 2005 elections, he did so as the candidate for a new right-of-center coalition known as Social and Democratic Power (PODEMOS), which included the bulk of Banzer's former ADN organization. His main opponent was the leftist Evo Morales of the Movement Towards Socialism. Morales won the election and Quiroga finished a distant second place, receiving 28.6% of the vote. In the mid-2000s, it appeared that ADN has become a defunct former party, replaced by Quiroga's new PODEMOS organization, although its structures, ideology, and supporters remained basically the same. However, as of 2015, it was still a legal political party in Bolivia.

Electoral history

Presidential elections

Legislative elections

References

External links
Official Facebook

1979 establishments in Bolivia
Bolivian nationalism
Conservative parties in Bolivia
International Democrat Union former member parties
National conservative parties
Nationalist parties in Bolivia
Neoliberal parties
Political parties established in 1979
Political parties in Bolivia
Right-wing parties in South America